Arakatavemula is a village located in Rajupalem Mandal of YSR District, Andhra Pradesh, India. Surrounding villages for Arakatavemula village are Parlapdu (West), Kummara palle (North), Pottipadu (South) and Somapuram (East).

Demographics
Arakatavemula village has population of 2929 out of that 1463 are males and 1466 are females as per Census 2011. In this village population of children with age 0-6 is 369 which makes up 12.60% of total population of village. Average Sex Ratio of Arakatavemula village is 1002 which is higher than Andhra Pradesh state average of 993. It has higher literacy rate compared to Andhra Pradesh. In 2011, literacy rate of Arakatavemula village was 68.59% compared to 67.02% of Andhra Pradesh. In Arakatavemula Male literacy stands at 80.43% while female literacy rate was 57.35%.

References

 http://www.census2011.co.in/data/village/592897-arakatavemula-andhra-pradesh.html
 https://web.archive.org/web/20150706135607/http://kadapa.nic.in/govtlands.htm

Villages in Kadapa district